Tyrant Books is an independent book publisher based in Rome, Italy and New York, New York. It was created in 2009 by Giancarlo DiTrapano as an offshoot of New York Tyrant Magazine, which was also founded by DiTrapano, in 2006.

History 

Tyrant Books was created to publish books less suited to large publishing houses, often because of their non-mainstream appeal. Giancarlo DiTrapano is quoted in the Los Angeles Review of Books as saying: "It would have taken forever for me to do anything I wanted to do [working for a traditional publishing house], but I had a little money, so I started a press."

In 2006, he founded New York Tyrant Magazine, which published "writers the big houses refused to touch". The magazine was put on hiatus until December 2016, when it was brought back as an online journal, with Dr. Jordan Castro as the editor.

In 2009, the magazine marked the beginning of the publication's transition to book publishing when it published 500 copies of the novella Baby Leg by Brian Evenson.

In 2013, Tyrant Books partnered with Fat Possum Records after DiTrapano met with Matthew Johnson, owner of Fat Possum Records. Johnson developed an interest in saving the publishing house — which was struggling financially — and became 50 percent owner. He took over the business aspects of Tyrant Books while DiTrapano was freed to focus more on the editorial side of the business.

In 2014, Tyrant Books published Preparation for the Next Life by Atticus Lish, winner of the 2015 PEN/Faulkner Prize for fiction. As of January 2015, the book had sold 15,000 copies.

DiTrapano, a native of Charleston, West Virginia, died in March 2021, at the age of 47.

Publications of Tyrant Books 

 Baby Leg, Brian Evenson (2009) - Fiction
 Firework, Eugene Marten (2010, 2017 re-release) - Fiction/Literary
 Us, Michael Kimball (2011) - Fiction/Psychological
 Life is With People, Atticus Lish (2011) - Drawings
 Sky Saw, Blake Butler (2012) - Fiction/Gothic
 Strange Cowboy, Lincoln Dahl Turns Five, Sam Michel (2012) - Fiction/Literary
 Solip, Ken Baumann (2013) - Fiction/Literary
 What Purpose Did I Serve In Your Life, Marie Calloway (2013) - Fiction/Short Stories
 Hill William, Scott McClanahan (2013) - Fiction/Cultural Heritage
 Preparation For The Next Life, Atticus Lish (2014) - Fiction/Literary
 Bad Sex, Clancy Martin (2015) - Fiction/Literary
 Supremacist, David Shapiro (2016) - Fiction/Literary
 White Nights in Split Town City, Annie DeWitt (2016) - Fiction/Literary
 Literally Show Me a Healthy Person, Darcie Wilder (2017) - Fiction/Literary
 The Sarah Book, Scott McClanahan (2017) - Fiction/Literary
 Floating Notes, Babak Lakghomi (2018) - Fiction/Literary
 Liveblog, Megan Boyle (2018) - Fiction/Literary
 Under the Sea, Mark Leidner (2018) - Fiction/Literary
 Welfare, Steve Anwyll (2019) - Fiction/Literary
 Essays and Fictions, Brad Phillips (2019) - Fiction/Literary
 The Great American Suction, David Nutt (2019) - Fiction/Literary
 Vincent and Alice and Alice, Shane Jones (2019) - Fiction/Literary
 The Complete Gary Lutz, Gary Lutz (2019) - Fiction/Literary
 Pets, Jordan Castro (editor), 2020 - Fiction and Nonfiction/Literary

References

External links 
 NY Tyrant official webpage

Publishing companies established in 2009
Book publishing companies of Italy
Book publishing companies of the United States
Italian companies established in 2009